Tytus Sylwester Woyciechowski (31 December 1808 – 23 March 1879) was a Polish political activist, agriculturalist, and patron of art. He was an early friend of the Polish composer Frédéric Chopin.

The spelling of Woyciechowski's surname is an archaic version of the more common "Wojciechowski", with a "j" instead of a "y".

Life
Woyciechowski was born in Lemberg, Galicia (now Lviv, Ukraine).

Friend of Chopin
In his youth Woyciechowski was a fellow student of Chopin's at the Warsaw Lyceum, boarding with the Chopin family. He went on to study law at Warsaw University. 

Chopin dedicated to him his Op. 2 Variations on "Là ci darem la mano". Woyciechowski wrote on the front page of the Variations “J’accepte avec plaisir“ (“I accept with pleasure“).. In October 1829 Chopin sent him the Waltz Op. 70,3 together with a letter. In July 1830 Chopin visited Woyciechowski at his estate in Poturzyn, which Woyciechowski had inherited from his mother. Chopin recalled this visit in a letter:

Many biographers believe that Woyciechowski acted as a confidant for Chopin during an alleged infatuation with the singer Konstancja Gładkowska. 

Chopin's correspondence with Tytus in this period has given rise to conjecture that Chopin's friendship with Tytus may have been homoerotic, at least on Chopin's part.

Woyciechowski accompanied Chopin in his 1830 journey to Austria but, on learning of the November 1830 Uprising, returned to Warsaw to take part in the fighting. He became a second lieutenant and was awarded the highest Polish military decoration, the Virtuti Militari. While the two never met thereafter, they continued to correspond.

Later life
In 1838, Woychiechowski married Countess Aloysia Poletylo, by whom he had four children – their second son being named Fryderyk, after Chopin.
 
Woyciechowski dedicated himself to agriculture, pioneered the introduction of crop rotation in Poland, and in 1847 founded one of the first sugar factories in the country. In 1861–62 he was an active member of the White Party, which took part in the failed January 1863 Uprising.

He died in Poturzyn, now Poland.

The Woyciechowski collection of Chopin memorabilia was destroyed by fire in 1914: It contained a piano made by the Buchholtz company, on which Chopin played and composed, copies of his compositions (the piano Variations à quatre mains ending in a fugue, written on 17 pages, and a contredanse), Chopin's letters to Tytus Woyciechowski and a pen in the shape of a column, with a head and base in gold and a core in coloured mosaic. The base, decorated with the  initials T.W., served at the same time as a seal. A card with Chopin's dedication lay in a special case. The family manor house at Poturzyn was destroyed during the Second World War.

Notes

Sources
 "Tytus Woyciechowski" (a) on Chopin Institute website (in Polish), accessed 12.2.2014
 "Tytus Woyciechowski" (b) on Chopin Kalejdoskop website, accessed 12.2.2014. 
 Walker, Alan (2018). Fryderyk Chopin: A Life and Times. London: Faber and Faber. 
 Zamoyski, Adam (2010). Chopin, Prince of the Romantics, London: HarperPress. .

1808 births
1879 deaths
Businesspeople from Lviv
Polish agriculturalists
Frédéric Chopin
19th-century Polish politicians